Chance Comanche (born April 14, 1996) is an American professional basketball player for the Stockton Kings of the NBA G League. He played college basketball for the Arizona Wildcats.

High school and college career
He graduated from Beverly Hills High School in 2015 after having averaged 20.1 points, 16.0 rebounds and 4.0 blocks per game as a senior en route to a Southern Section 3A title.

In his two years at the University of Arizona (2015–2017), Comanche saw the court in 60 games, producing averages of 4.9 points and 2.8 boards a contest. On April 8, 2017, he declared for the 2017 NBA draft and on May 5, 2017, announced his decision to forgo the remaining two years of his college eligibility and to stay in the draft. However, he was not selected by any team.

Professional career
After going undrafted, Comanche joined the Drew League, a pro-am league after not being invited to the NBA Summer League. In November he joined the Memphis Hustle of the NBA G League. In his first season, he averaged 9.2 points and 5.4 rebounds per game.

On January 7, 2019, the Canton Charge had acquired Comanche from Memphis Hustle for a Raptors 905’s 2019 second-round pick and the returning right to Jordan Mathews.

In 2021, Comanche signed with the Enid Outlaws of The Basketball League. On April 19, he scored 43 points in a 152–78 win against the Lewisville Leopards. Comanche averaged 27.4 points, 12.9 rebounds, 2.1 assists and 1.3 blocks per game. On June 24, 2021, he signed with Yeni Mamak Spor of the Turkish Basketball First League. On December 21, he was named league player of the week after posting 24 points and 16 rebounds in a win against Bornova Belediyespor.

Stockton Kings (2022–present)
On November 3, 2022, Comanche was named to the opening night roster for the Stockton Kings.

References

External links
 Arizona Wildcats bio
 Profile at eurobasket.com

1996 births
Living people
American men's basketball players
American expatriate basketball people in Turkey
Arizona Wildcats men's basketball players
Basketball players from California
Canton Charge players
Centers (basketball)
Memphis Hustle players
Sportspeople from Beverly Hills, California